WRDR (89.7 FM, "Bridge FM") is a radio station broadcasting a Christian radio format. Licensed to Freehold Township, New Jersey, it serves the New York metropolitan area. The station is currently owned by Bridgelight, LLC. Bridgelight, LLC was created as a counterpart to Christian denomination Calvary Chapel Old Bridge.

The station simulcasts on WPLJ 95.5-HD3 and on several FM translators, as well as on WJUX, formerly known as "Jukebox Radio."

History

WRDR
WRDR was once assigned to a Big band format station broadcast from Egg Harbor City, New Jersey and owned by Nassau Broadcasting Partners. Following the demise of the station, the WRDR was acquired by the Old Bridge, New Jersey congregation of Calvary Chapel.

Calvary Chapel Old Bridge's board approved providing the funding and along with Cornerstone Calvary Chapel's help were able to form Bridgelight Media LLC and purchase WRDR in Howell, New Jersey. The station, renamed "The Bridge", went on the air for the first time on June 27, 2003. Shortly before sign-on, they were able to purchase the financially and legally troubled easy listening music outlet WJUX, which added another full power radio station on 99.7 FM and two translators on 103.1 and 94.3, increasing the potential coverage to over 6.5 million people, and enabling them to reach a good part of New York City.

Bridge FM holds "BridgeFest", an annual two-day music festival every summer in Ocean Grove, New Jersey, which features headline acts from notable Contemporary Christian music acts, as well as teachings, vendors, crafts, as well as surfing clinics and events.

WJUX

WJUX 103.1 from 1993 to 2004 was known as "Jukebox Radio" and originally played Traditional Big Band Music in 1993 before evolving to more of an adult standards format by 1995. By then, WJUX-FM 99.7 Monticello, New York began simulcasting "Jukebox Radio" and it began commercial operation.

Originally licensed as a Non-Commercial station "Jukebox Radio" hit the air on March 5, 1993 on low power station 103.1 FM with DJs Lee Martin (Morning and Afternoon Drive), Matthew Borzi (Mid-days) and Larry Hopper (Evenings). The station was owned by Gerry Turro. Gerry Turro was the chief engineer of 1130 WNEW New York City from the 1980s until 1992 when WNEW folded. That station also had a big band/adult standards format from 1981 to 1992. Jerry purchased WNEW's music library at the end of 1992 for use on Jukebox Radio.

Jukebox radio's music was originally a blend of traditional adult standards and big bands from the 1930s, 1940s and early 1950s. Core artists originally included Frank Sinatra, Tommy Dorsey, Mills Brothers, Peggy Lee, Ella Fitzgerald, Louis Armstrong, Andrews Sisters, Artie Shaw, Bing Crosby, Duke Ellington, and others. The station, initially, only played a handful of songs newer than 1955 and sounded similar to the 1981 version of 1130 WNEW.

In 1994, more easy listening artists such as Nat King Cole, Tony Bennett, Ray Charles, Lettermen, Perry Como, Jerry Vale, pre-1970 Barbra Streisand, and others were added and Jukebox began playing more of the 1960s non rock songs but no baby boomer pop just yet. Jukebox Radio was commercial free originally but each hour was underwritten by various sponsors. In 1995, WJUX was able to become a commercial station when buying commercial license 99.7 FM in Monticello, New York, which was nearly 100 miles away, becoming WJUX-FM. WJUX-LP 103.1 in Bergen County became a translator station for WJUX. But what was unusual was that the station's studios and offices and announcers were all based in Bergen County. The station transmitted from the 103.1 frequency and sent the signal through fiber optic cable to WJUX-FM in Monticello which rebroadcast the signal to the north-western section of The Hudson Valley. At this point, Jukebox Radio became a commercial station.

In 1995, Jukebox Radio began mixing in baby boomer pop artists like Elvis Presley, Beatles, Neil Diamond, Carpenters, James Taylor, and others. Initially the songs were softer and heard a few times an hour. By 1996, more soft AC artists as well as Oldies artists from the 50's and 60's were mixed in. This included Elton John, Four Tops, Chicago, Billy Joel, Temptations, Stevie Wonder, and others. The station had cut out Big Bands altogether and began cutting back on standards artists as well. The station was about half standards, and half Oldies and Soft AC gold. In 1997, most standards artists and songs were dropped and the station shifted to Oldies from 1955 to about 1989. The station remained an oldies outlet throughout 1998 and 1999.

In June 2000, with an announcement several weeks before, Jukebox Radio flipped back to adult standards from Oldies. This standards format would focus on the Sinatra type artists but would also mix in a lot of softer songs by rock and roll oldies artists and some soft AC cuts. The station was about half baby boomer pop and half traditional standards. The station played few big bands at this point. The station would stay with this format until it would be sold in 2004.

In 2002, WVNJ lost its legal battle  and later appealed to have Jukebox Radio taken off the air. Gerry Turro decided that Jukebox Radio would be worth more if it were sold. The translator was eventually sold for $2.2 million.

Current programming
Bridge FM broadcasts a wide variety of programming including Contemporary Rhythmic Praise and Worship Music, preaching and teaching, brief Christian features, instructional Christian programming, Church services, and Children's programs. Programs include Somebody Loves You with Raul Ries, A New Beginning with Greg Laurie, The Word for Today with Chuck Smith, In Touch with Charles Stanley, among other programs.

Simulcasts

The station also simulcasts on WPLJ-HD3, New York City (95.5-3).

Translators

References

External links

RDR
Radio stations established in 2003
Freehold Township, New Jersey